The Micronesian Games records in athletics are set by athletes who are representing one of the 10 Micronesian Games Council member federations at the Micronesian Games. The games are quadrennial events that began in 1969. The list is compiled from the Athletics Weekly webpage courtesy of Tony Isaacs, and from the Oceania Athletics Association webpage.  Dates and some relay teams were determined from the national records publication of the Oceania Athletics Association, from the Pacific Islands Athletics Statistics, from the Marshall Islands Journal, and from the 2006 and 2010 results lists.

The record assignment for the sprints and jumps is tentative, because there is almost no wind information.

Men

Women

Records in defunct events

Men's events

Women's events

References

Athletics at the Micronesian Games
Micronesian Games